Bentharca is a genus of ark clams. Fossil species placed in the genus have been identified from the lower Miocene (23.03 mya).

Species
It contains 2 extant species, and 2 extinct species.

 Bentharca asperula (Dall, 1881)
 Bentharca avellanaria (Melvill & Standen, 1907)
 †Bentharca inexpectata (P. A. Maxwell, 1966) 
 †Bentharca waitakarensis Eagle, 2000

References

Arcidae
Bivalve genera